103rd Street (Rosemoor) is a commuter rail station along Metra Electric's main line in the Rosemoor neighborhood of Chicago.

The station shares part of its name with two other stations on the Rock Island District line to the west. The first is on the main line in Washington Heights, and the other is on the Beverly Branch (or "Suburban Line") in the Beverly Hills neighborhood of Chicago to the west. This 103rd Station is the nearest Metra Electric station to Gately Stadium Park, which is used both by high school and Chicago State University athletic teams. Although Metra gives the address as 103rd Street & Cottage Grove Avenue, parking areas are actually located on 103rd Street and Dauphin Avenue.

Bus connections
CTA

  4 Cottage Grove 
  106 East 103rd 
  115 Pullman/115th

References

External links 

103rd Street entrance from Google Maps Street View

Metra stations in Chicago
Former Illinois Central Railroad stations